Tzomet (lit., Crossroads) is a small, right-wing political party in Israel.

History
The party was founded by General Rafael Eitan in 1983, after his retirement from the position of chief-of-staff in 1982. He headed it throughout its existence, and modeled it in his spirit as a secular, right-wing party with a strong agricultural side. Many of Tzomet's members and MKs were neighbors of Eitan in Tel Adashim (a small moshav). Tzomet ran for the 1984 elections in a joint list with the Tehiya party, and Eitan was its only member of the Knesset. Tzomet and the Tehiya parted way in 1987, and Tzomet ran independently in the 1988 elections, winning two seats. The party joined Yitzhak Shamir's government in 1990, and Eitan was appointed Minister of Agriculture. However, the party left the coalition in December 1991 in protest at Shamir's participation in the Madrid Conference.

In the 1992 elections, Tzomet rode a wave of secularist sentiment, gaining the support of many young Israelis, leading to a surprising result of eight seats. Despite Tzomet's success it was not included in Yitzhak Rabin's left-wing coalition. The party's surprising success was also its downfall. None of the new MKs had any political experience, and most were completely unknown. Due to Raful's position in his party, the party was jokingly described as "Raful and the seven dwarfs". Allegations of tyrannical behavior by Raful were raised, and in February 1992, three members: Gonen Segev, Esther Salmovitz, and Alex Goldfarb—left and founded the Yiud party (which then also splintered into Atid). The three left the party because Segev was offered the position of Minister of Energy by Yitzhak Rabin if he voted in favour of the Oslo Accords, which Tzomet opposed, and which would not have passed without his vote.

The splintering and infighting reduced the popularity of the party, despite this, ahead of the 1996 elections, Eitan became known as a potential candidate for PM. In the end Tzomet chose to run in a joint list with the Likud and Gesher under the name "National Camp List". Tzomet was ensured several relatively high places in the combined list, partly as a reward for the withdrawal of Eitan as prime minister candidate, as the Likud feared that he would act as a spoiler for their candidate, Benjamin Netanyahu. The 1996 elections were the first Israeli elections to feature a double vote: one for the Knesset, and one direct vote for the prime minister. As part of the joint list, Tzomet managed to get all five of its Knesset members back into the Knesset. However, over the course of the next few years, Tzomet continued to splinter: Pini Badash left to run in municipal politics, Moshe Peled broke away to form his own Mekhora faction before joining Moledet while Eliezer Sandberg left to form the Centre Party. By the end of the 14th Knesset, Tzomet only had 2 MKs left: Eitan himself and Haim Dayan.

Following the dissolution of the Likud–Gesher–Tzomet alliance ahead of the 1999 elections, Tzomet was in the "political desert", it attempted to join the National Union joint list or rejoin an alliance with the Likud, however both ventures failed and Tzomet ran alone for the Knesset. Over the years Tzomet had lost almost all its support, and won just 4,128 votes, less than 10% of the number needed to cross the 1.5% electoral threshold. After the humiliating defeat, Eitan retired from the political life. Following the retirement of Eitan, the party faded into obscurity in the Israeli political scene

Despite Rafael Eitan's departure, the party, now headed by Moshe Gerin, ran in the 2003, the 2006 elections, and the 2009 elections, but won only 2,023, 1,342, and 1,520 votes, respectively, in the three elections, not meeting the election threshold in any of them. Following their failure to reach the threshold in four successive elections, the party decided not to run in the 2013 and 2015 elections.

Modern Tzomet

In the lead up to the April 2019 elections, Likud MK Oren Hazan failed to achieve a realistic spot in the Likud list, receiving only a small number of votes in the primaries. Following his failure in the Likud primaries, Oren Hazan declared that he would leave the Likud and head his own party, taking over the long-dormant Tzomet party.

Hazan reformed the party, abandoning Eitan's secularism and statesmanlike conduct in favor of Hazan's own rightwing populist policy and rhetoric. Under Hazan, Tzomet received the best result since Eitan's departure, earning 2,417 votes. Despite Hazan's marginal success, this result was far from enough to reach the electoral threshold, and Oren Hazan lost his Knesset seat.

Following Hazan's failure to revive the party, it returned to the hands of Moshe Gerin who brought the party back to its original form, focusing on agrarianism and settlement. The party received an even better result in the September 2019 elections, receiving 14,805 votes (0.33% of the popular vote).

Ideology

Tzomet's ideology was heavily reflective of Rafael Eitan (Raful) himself. Eitan was a moshavnik, as such, he was influenced by the moshavnik agricultural, nationalist and secularist ideology. 
Raful's Tzomet's platform included:
 Separation of religion and state and military recruitment of Ultra Orthodox Jews.
 Annexation of the West Bank.
 Restricting voting rights only to those who have completed national service.
 Switching to a presidential system.
 Aggressive policy against Palestinian terrorism.
 Economic policy based on economic liberalism and agriculture.

Under the leadership of Oren Hazan, Tzomet's ideology changed considerably. Tzomet no longer mentioned any changes to Israel's voting or government system. Hazan  shifted Tzomet's focus away from secularism and recruitment of the Ultra Orthodox. Under Hazan, Tzomet focused primarily on criticizing Netanyahu's defense policy from the right and supporting more aggressive measures against terrorism and against the Israeli Arab members of the Knesset. After Hazan left the party, and Moshe Gerin came back to lead it, Tzomet's ideology returned to its agrarianist base. The party's support dwindled 280 times in the fall-winter 2019.

Leaders

Election results

Knesset members

References

External links
Party history Knesset website
Israel Today Elections 96 Jewish Agency

Agrarian parties
Political parties established in 1983
Secular Jewish culture in Israel
Revisionist Zionism
Right-wing parties
Right-wing politics in Israel
Zionist political parties in Israel